Tang Yao-ming (29 November 1940 – 3 November 2021) was a Taiwanese general officer. He was the Minister of National Defense of the Republic of China (ROC) from 2002 to 2004.

Ministry of National Defense
Tang was named to the position of defense minister on 20 January 2002, making him the first person born on the island of Taiwan to have held the post.

2002 United States visit
In 2002, Tang visited St. Petersburg, Florida, United States to attend the U.S.-Taiwan Defense summit, making him the first ROC Minister of National Defense to visit the United States after the U.S. government ended official relations with Taiwan in 1979.

Death
Tang died, aged 80, on 3 November 2021, at the Tri-Service General Hospital.

References

1940 births
2021 deaths
Kuomintang politicians in Taiwan
Taiwanese Ministers of National Defense
Taiwanese politicians of Hakka descent
Politicians of the Republic of China on Taiwan from Taichung